The Hunted Slaves is a mid 19th century painting by British artist Richard Ansdell. Done in oil on canvas, the work depicts two African American slaves facing down a group of hunting dogs as the two slaves flee. The work is in the collection of the International Slavery Museum in Liverpool.

References 

1861 paintings
Paintings in Liverpool
English paintings
Slavery in art